Incorporation is the formation of a new corporation. The corporation may be a business, a nonprofit organization, sports club, or a local government of a new city or town.

In the United States

Specific incorporation requirements in the United States differ on a state by state basis. However, there are common pieces of information that states require to be included in the certificate of incorporation.

Business purpose
Corporation name
Registered agent
Inc.
Share par value
Number of authorized shares of stock
Directors
Preferred shares
Officers
Legal address

A business purpose describes the incorporated tasks a company has to do or provide. The purpose can be general, indicating that the budding company has been formed to carry out "all lawful business" in the region. Alternatively, the purpose can be specific, furnishing a more detailed explanation of the products and/or services to be offered by their company.

The chosen name should be followed with a corporate identifier such as "Corp.", "Inc.", or "Co.". A preliminary name availability search is advisable prior to the submission of the Articles of Incorporation. In the case of online incorporation, the state will have the final say with regards to the name chosen for the company. The name shouldn't deceive or mislead consumers.

Registered agents are responsible for receiving all legal and tax documentation on behalf of the corporation.

Share per value refers to the stated minimum value and generally doesn't correspond to the actual share value. In reality, the value of a share is based on its fair market value or the amount a buyer is willing to pay. An Inc. stipulates the exact number of shares the corporation is willing to authorize. It is mandatory for every corporation to have stock. If the corporation is willing to permit both preferred as well as common shares of stock, then this should have a mention in the articles of incorporation, along with the voting rights information. Generally, preferred shares provide its shareholders preferential payments of distribution of assets or dividends, in case the company shuts down its operations. A lot of small business owners only allow shares of common stock.

Legal benefits

There are a number of legal benefits that come with incorporation.

One significant legal benefit is the protection of personal assets against the claims of creditors and lawsuits. Sole proprietors and general partners in a partnership are personally and jointly responsible for all the legal liability (LL) of a business such as loans, accounts payable, and legal judgments. In a corporation, however, shareholders, directors and officers typically are not liable for the company's debts and obligations. They are limited in liability to the amount they have invested in the corporation. For example, if a shareholder purchased $100 in stock, no more than $100 can be lost. On the other hand, a corporation (Corp.) or a limited liability company (LLC) may hold assets such as real estate, cars or boats. If a shareholder of a corporation is personally involved in a lawsuit or bankruptcy, these assets may be protected. A creditor of a shareholder of a Corp. or LLC cannot seize the assets of the company. However, the creditor may be able to seize ownership shares in the corporation, as they are considered a personal asset.

In the United States, corporations can sometimes be taxed at a lower rate than individuals. Also, corporations can own shares in other corporations and receive corporate dividends 80% tax-free. There are no limits on the amount of losses a corporation may carry forward to subsequent tax years. A sole proprietorship, on the other hand, cannot claim a capital loss greater than $3,000 unless the owner has offsetting capital gains.

A corporation is capable of continuing indefinitely. Its existence is not affected by the death of shareholders, directors, or officers of the corporation. Ownership in a Corp. or LLC is easily transferable to others, either in whole or in part. Some state laws are particularly corporate-friendly. For example, the transfer of ownership in a corporation incorporated in US-DE is not required to be filed or recorded.

Legal history of incorporation in the United States
Legal opinion on corporations has evolved significantly throughout history, and Supreme Court cases provide a means to observe this evolution. While these cases may seem arbitrary and decontextualized when examined individually, when viewed successively and within historical context, a narrative emerges that offers an explanation for why such views are upheld.

Trustees of Dartmouth College v. Woodward, 1819

In 1816, the New Hampshire state legislature passed a bill intended to turn privately owned Dartmouth College into a publicly owned university with a Board of Trustees appointed by the governor. The board filed a suit challenging the constitutionality of the legislation. The suit alleged that the college enjoyed the right to contract and the government changing that contract was not allowed. Chief Justice John Marshall delivered the majority opinion and affirmed that the right to contract exists between owners of private property rather than between a government and its citizens. The case was the first case in US history that asked fundamental questions about corporate entities and the protections they enjoy; it also was a precedent-setting case in extending "individual rights" to corporations.

Santa Clara County v. Southern Pacific Railroad, 1886
The railroad was an expensive multi-year project that greatly changed and altered both the physical and commercial landscape of the country. As with most new technology developments that have a broad impact, there are disputes about how those technologies and the businesses they thrive in fit under the umbrella of laws that govern regulations and taxation. In 1886 one such taxation dispute arose between Santa Clara County and Southern Pacific Railroad. The railroad thought the tax code was misapplied to some of their property and assets. In deciding the case, a unanimous court ruled that governments must abide by the same tax code enforcement for individuals that it did for corporations. While not explicitly stated in the case, it was implied that this case extended equal protection rights to corporations under the 14th amendment.

Liggett v. Lee, 1933
The booming economy the railroad corporations helped build from the late 19th into the early 20th centuries came to a screeching halt in 1929. The Great Depression, as it came to be known, helped a view of corporations emerge that put them at odds with the normal working man. The election of Franklin D. Roosevelt was a manifestation of many populist sentiments the country might have felt. In 1933 a Florida case came before the court, again disputing taxation. In Liggett v. Lee the court ruled that there could be a corporate tax, essentially saying the structure of business was a justifiably discriminatory criterion for governments to consider when writing tax legislation. This was a unique ruling handed down during a unique time in US history that denied a corporation freedom it sought in the courtroom.

First National Bank of Boston v. Bellotti, 1978
From 1940 to 1990 the percent of total GDP made up by financial service professionals increased by 300%. Along with that growth there was a growth in the profits this industry experienced as well. As the disposable income of banks and other financial institutions rose, they sought a way to use it to influence politics and policy. In response, Massachusetts passed a law limiting corporate donations strictly to issues related to their industry. The First National Bank of Boston challenged the law on First Amendment grounds and won. First National Bank of Boston v. Bellotti allowed business to use financial speech in political causes of any nature.

Citizens United v. FEC, 2010
In 2010 amidst an outpouring of frustration and blame directed at Wall Street the issue of corporate contributions came before the court again. In Citizens United v. FEC the court said there was virtually no distinction between monetary contributions and political speech, and because we do not limit political speech unless it is tantamount to bribery, corporations have the right as people to donate unlimited amounts of money to any political cause so long as it is not to a direct campaign.

Steps required for incorporation
The articles of incorporation (also called a charter, certificate of incorporation or letters patent) are filed with the appropriate state office, listing the purpose of the corporation, its principal place of business and the number and type of shares of stock. A registration fee is due, which is usually between $25 and $1,000, depending on the state.

A corporate name is generally made up of three parts: "distinctive element", "descriptive element", and a legal ending. All corporations must have a distinctive element, and in most filing jurisdictions, a legal ending to their names. Some corporations choose not to have a descriptive element. In the name "Tiger Computers, Inc.", the word "Tiger" is the distinctive element; the word "Computers" is the descriptive element; and the "Inc." is the legal ending. The legal ending indicates that it is in fact a legal corporation and not just a business registration or partnership. Incorporated, limited, and corporation, or their respective abbreviations (Inc., Ltd., Corp.) are the possible legal endings in the US.

Usually, there are also corporate bylaws which must be filed with the state. Bylaws outline a number of important administrative details such as when annual shareholder meetings will be held, who can vote and the manner in which shareholders will be notified if there is need for an additional "special" meeting.

Taxation

Corporations can only deduct net operating losses going back two years and forward 20 years.

Reporting after incorporation
Assuming a corporation has not sold stock to the public, conducting corporate business is straightforward. Often, it amounts to recording key corporate decisions (for example, borrowing money or buying real estate) and holding an annual meeting. These formalities can often be supplanted by written agreement and do not usually need a face-to-face meeting.

Incorporation in the United Kingdom

In the UK, the process of incorporation is generally called company formation. The United Kingdom is one of the quickest locations to incorporate, with a fully electronic process and a very fast turnaround by the national registrar of companies, the Companies House. The current Companies House record is five minutes to vet and issue a certificate of incorporation for an electronic application.

Types of companies
There are many different types of UK companies:

Public limited company (PLC)
Private company limited by shares (Ltd.)
Company limited by guarantee
Unlimited company (Unltd.)
Limited liability partnership (LLP)
Community interest company
Industrial and provident society (IPS)
Royal charter (RC)

Europe

 In Germany, Austria and Switzerland, the GmbH ("Gesellschaft mit beschränkter Haftung", meaning "limited liability business association"), as well as the AG ("Aktiengesellschaft", meaning "business association with shares"), are the entities most similar to the corporations in the US.
 In the United Kingdom, with the exception of an unlimited company or corporation which requires no designation as part of its legal company name, the titles Ltd. (limited company) or plc (public limited company) are used for corporations.
 In France, Switzerland, Belgium and Luxembourg, the term "SARL (company with limited liability)" or SA (anonymous corporation) or SAS (simplified anonymous joint-stock corporation) is used.
 Spain, Portugal, Romania and Latin America use the title SA (anonymous partnership) for stock corporations or Ltda (limitada or limited liability) for limited companies. (Ltda is denoted SL in Spain, for "Sociedad Limitada", and SRL in Argentina, for "Sociedad de Responsabilidad Limitada").
 In Poland there is the title SA (standing for Spółka Akcyjna, Polish for stock partnership) for stock corporations or Sp. z o.o. (Spółka z ograniczoną odpowiedzialnością, a partnership with limited liability) for limited companies. There is also Spółka komandytowa (Sp. K.), a partnership where at least one partner is fully liable and other one has limited liability, and Spółka komandytowo-akcyjna (Sp. K. A.) a partnership where at least one partner is fully liable and other one is a stock shareholder not being liable.
 Denmark and Norway use the title A/S for stock corporations, while Sweden uses the similar AB. Finland uses Oy, Oyj for stock corporations (Osakeyhtiö, julkinen) and Ay (Avoin yhtiö) or Ky (Kommandiittiyhtiö) for private enterprises.
 Italy uses "Srl" or "Società a Responsabilità Limitata" (limited liability company), and "SpA" or "Società Per Azioni" (stock corporation).
 Slovakia and the Czech Republic use s.r.o. (meaning "business with limited liability") and a.s. (meaning "business with shares").
 In Latvia, the most commonly used title of a corporation is "S.I.A." for "limited liability company", or "LLC", and "A/S" for "joint stock company", or "JSC". The title "S.I.A." and "A/S" are put before the name of the corporation. Lithuania uses "UAB" for "limited liability company" and "AB" for "joint stock company", and, like in Latvia, they also appear before the corporation's name.
 Bulgaria, Serbia, Croatia, Bosnia and Herzegovina, Montenegro, North Macedonia, and Slovenia uses: "D.O.O." or "Д.О.О." (in Cyrillic) (Serbian and Croatian:  Društvo sa Ograničenom Odgovornošću / Друштво са Ограниченом Одговорношћу, Macedonian: Друштво со ограничена одговорност). The only difference is in Bulgaria, where it is reversed: "ООД" (OOD) (Bulgarian: Дружество с ограничена отговорност, romanization: Druzhestvo s ogranichena otgovornost). It also can be used for Ltd. (UK)
Albania uses "Sh.p.k" for "limited liability company", "Sh.a.", meaning "anonymous partnership", for stock corporations. Pursuant to the Albanian legislation, the possible business structures are:

 Sole proprietorship (person fizik) – A business owned and managed by one individual who is personally liable for all business debts and obligations.
 Limited liability company (LLC) – A hybrid legal structure that provides the limited liability features of a corporation and the tax efficiencies and operational flexibility of a partnership.
 Corporation – A legal entity owned by shareholders.
 Non-profit – An organization engaged in activities of public or private interest where making a profit is not a primary mission. Some non-profits are exempt from federal taxes.
 In the Netherlands, N.V. (Naamloze Vennootschap) and B.V. (Besloten Vennootschap met beperkte aansprakelijkheid) are used. In Belgium, the abbreviations NV and Bvba (or BV, resulting the new Belgian Code of Companies and Associations) are used for similar types of entity.

Asia

 In India, the term Pvt Ltd is used for a company that is private, an entity similar to an LLC in the United States. Ltd is used for publicly listed companies (shares of a listed company are traded on the stock market) or a public corporation, a similar entity to a corporation in the US.
 Indonesia uses PT, meaning "private limited", which is the equivalent of an incorporated entity in the US. This legal title is stated in front of the corporation name. If the shares become publicly listed for trading in stock exchange, it is called Tbk., appended after the corporation name.
 China uses WFOE (or WOFE), to refer to a Wholly Foreign Owned Enterprise (WFOE). This is the most popular form of business entity for foreign investors wanting to set up a company in China; it is a limited liability company.
 Malaysia uses Sdn. Bhd., meaning "private limited", which is the equivalent of an incorporated entity in the US.
 Singapore uses Pte. Ltd., meaning "private limited", which is the equivalent of an incorporated entity in the US.
 Dubai uses "LLC" to denote a limited liability company. Listed companies use "PJSC" to denote a public joint stock company.
 In Turkey, there are two types of companies: Joint Stock Company (JSC) and Limited Liability Company (LLC). 100% foreign ownership of a JSC is legally permitted under the Turkish Law. A foreigner who has never been to Turkey can become a shareholder of a Turkish JSC by way of a power of attorney. Ltd. Şti. (which stands for Limited Şirketi) is a common form to denote limited liability companies.
 In the Philippines, it uses the terms, Corporation & Incorporated (Inc.). similar entity to a corporation in the US.

Canada
In Canada, the process of incorporation can be done either at the federal or provincial level. Companies which incorporate with the federal government will generally need to register extra-provincially in the province that they elect to do business. Similarly, a provincial corporation may need to register extra-provincially if they are to have offices outside of their home province. Incorporated Canadian companies can generally use either Corp., Corporation, Inc., Incorporated, Incorporée, Limited, Limitée, Ltd., Ltée, Société par actions de régime fédéral, and S.A.R.F in their name, but this may vary from province to province. Note that there are two government structures operating within Canada. French system is prevalent in Quebec, while the English system is operating in 9 provinces/territories.

See also
 Articles of incorporation
 BVBA
 Delaware corporation
 General incorporation law
 Limited liability company
 List of company registers
 Types of business entity

References

External links
 How to Incorporate Your New Business a wikiHow article
 What is an incorporated business – smallbusiness.chron.com

Corporate law
Corporations
Organization